CoRoT-4b (formerly known as CoRoT-Exo-4b) is an extrasolar planet orbiting the star CoRoT-4. It is probably in synchronous orbit with stellar rotation. It was discovered by the French CoRoT mission in 2008.

References

External links

Hot Jupiters
Transiting exoplanets
Exoplanets discovered in 2008
Giant planets
Monoceros (constellation)
4b

de:Extrasolarer Planet#CoRoT-4 b